Kreeger is a surname. Notable people with the name include:

 Carol Kreeger Davidson (1929–2014), American sculptor
 David Lloyd Kreeger (1909–1990), American art philanthropist
 Frank Kreeger (died 1899), American baseball player
 George H. Kreeger, 20th-century American politician and judge

See also
 Kreeger Museum, a private museum in Washington, D.C.
 Kreiger (surname)
 Kreuger (surname)